Baron Wraxall, of Clyst St George in the County of Devon, is a title in the Peerage of the United Kingdom. It was created in 1928 for the Conservative politician George Gibbs. , the title is held by his grandson, the fourth Baron, who succeeded his father, a former diplomat, in that year. The Barons Wraxall are related to the Barons Aldenham and Barons Hunsdon of Hunsdon. The first Baron's grandfather William Gibbs was the younger brother of George Henry Gibbs, the father of Hucks Gibbs, 1st Baron Aldenham, whose fourth son was Herbert Gibbs, 1st Baron Hunsdon of Hunsdon.

The family seat was at Tyntesfield, near Wraxall, Somerset, which is now owned and administered by The National Trust.

Barons Wraxall (1928)
George Abraham Gibbs, 1st Baron Wraxall (1873–1931)
(George) Richard Lawley Gibbs, 2nd Baron Wraxall (1928–2001)
Eustace Hubert Beilby Gibbs, 3rd Baron Wraxall (1929–2017)
Antony Hubert Gibbs, 4th Baron Wraxall (born 1958)

Male-line family tree

See also
Baron Aldenham
Baron Hunsdon of Hunsdon

Notes

References
Kidd, Charles, Williamson, David (editors). Debrett's Peerage and Baronetage (1990 edition). New York: St Martin's Press, 1990, 

Baronies in the Peerage of the United Kingdom
Noble titles created in 1928
Noble titles created for UK MPs
 Wraxall